The Sweden national football team has traditionally been a strong team in international football, with twelve World Cup appearances—collecting one silver and two bronze medals—and three medals in the Olympics, including one gold. Sweden played its first international game against Norway in 1908 and competed in an international tournament, the Summer Olympics, for the first time the same year. Since then, Sweden has regularly qualified for the World Cup and the Olympics as well as the European Championships. The best results in the World Cup are a second place (as hosts) in the 1958 and two third places in 1950 and 1994. In the Olympics, Sweden has won the gold medal in 1948 as well as two bronze medals in 1924 and 1952. The best result in the European Championship is a semi-final loss in 1992 as hosts of the tournament.

Ten Swedish players are in the FIFA Century Club, having earned 100 or more caps. Anders Svensson is the most capped Swedish player at 148 appearances, fifth most of all European internationals. Björn Nordqvist, with 115 caps for Sweden, was the World record holder for international caps when he ended his national team career in 1978. With 62 goals in 116 caps, Zlatan Ibrahimović is the top scorer for the national team, Sven Rydell in second place with 49 goals in only 43 caps and Gunnar Nordahl in third with 43 goals in only 33 caps. Henrik Larsson with 37 goals in fourth place shares a World Cup record for the longest period between a player's first and last goals, with 12 years as he scored in both the 1994 and 2006 tournaments.

Three Sweden internationals have been top scorers in a major international tournament, Herbert Carlsson (not included in this list at only 20 caps) at the 1920 Olympics, Gunnar Nordahl at the 1948 Olympics and Tomas Brolin at the Euro 1992. No Swedish player has been awarded the World Cup Golden Boot, but Kennet Andersson won the Silver Boot in 1994 with Martin Dahlin winning the Bronze Boot in the same tournament. The last award was also won by Ralf Edström in 1974. Three Swedish players have been chosen for the World Cup All-Star Team, Erik Nilsson in 1950, Gunnar Gren in 1958 and Tomas Brolin in 1994.

The following list of Sweden international footballers covers all football players with 30 or more official caps for the Sweden national football team. The players are listed here sorted first by the total number of caps, and then by last name. Substitute appearances are included.

Key

List of players 

.

Notes

References 
Print

Online

 
Association football player non-biographical articles